The 2019–20 season is Hyderabad cricket team's 86th competitive season. The Hyderabad cricket team is senior men's domestic cricket team based in the city of Hyderabad, India, run by the Hyderabad Cricket Association (HCA). They represent the state of Telangana in domestic competitions.

The season was second in charge for the head coach and former player, Arjun Yadav. Ambati Rayudu came out of retirement to take the charge as the captain for the Vijay Hazare Trophy and Syed Mushtaq Ali Trophy while Tanmay Agarwal captained the side for the first time during the Ranji Trophy.

Squad 
The following players made at least one appearance for Hyderabad in first-class, List A or Twenty20 cricket in 2019–20 season.  Age given is at the start of Hyderabad's first match of the season (28 September 2019).
Players with international caps are listed in bold.

Competitions

Overview

Vijay Hazare Trophy

The Vijay Hazare Trophy, a List A cricket tournament in India, fixtures were announced by the Board of Control for Cricket in India (BCCI) on 14 September 2019 and the Hyderabad was placed in the Group A with all the group fixtures to be played in Bengaluru. The team was selected on 14 September with Ambati Rayudu, who came out of retirement recently, appointed as the captain. Earlier, Rayudu announced retirement from all forms of game following his non-selection to the Indian squad for the 2019 World Cup. The matches originally scheduled on the first three days got mostly washed out due to the unseasonal rains across the India. Overall, 17 of the 30 matches got washed out during this time which forced the BCCI rejig the schedule to accommodate the abandoned matches and to avoid the rains for the future matches.

Points Table
Group A

Points system : W = 4, T/NR = 2, L = 0.

Matches
Group stage

Syed Mushtaq Ali Trophy

Points Table
Group C

Points system : W = 4, T/NR = 2, L = 0.

Matches
Group stage

Ranji Trophy

Points table
Group A

Points system : Win by an innings or 10 wickets = 7, Win = 6, Draw with first innings lead = 3, Draw with first innings deficit = 1, No Result = 1, Loss = 0.

Matches
Group stage

Player statistics

Batting

Bowling

Fielding

References

External links
Hyderabad cricket team official site

Cricket in Hyderabad, India
Cricket in Telangana
Sport in Telangana